Nacna is a genus of moths of the family Noctuidae. It was described by David Stephen Fletcher in 1961

Species
Nacna buschmannferenci Ronkay, Ronkay & Varga, 2019
Nacna javensis (Warren, 1912)
Nacna malachitis (Oberthur, 1880)
Nacna prasinaria (Walker, 1865)
Nacna pulchripicta (Walker, 1865)
Nacna smaragdina (Draudt, 1937)
Nacna splendens (Moore, 1888)
Nacna sugitanii (Nagano, 1918)

References

Acronictinae